Horowitz Horror and More Horowitz Horror are two collections of short horror stories written by Anthony Horowitz, published in 1999 and 2000 respectively. A third set of stories called More Bloody Horowitz (or Bloody Horowitz in the United States) was published in 2009 (and later released as Scared to Death). The first two collections were also published in a single collection called The Complete Horowitz Horror (later released as Horowitz Horror: The Ultimate Collection).

Horowitz Horror was first published in 1999 and contained nine short stories. The stories in Horowitz Horror are written in a mixture of first-person and third-person narrative. Out of the nine stories, two (Light Moves and The Man with the Yellow Face) are conveyed from the viewpoint of the leading character.

Synopsis

Bath Night – A newly installed bath harbours the spirit of a Victorian era axe-murderer. The family's daughter, Isabel, has suspicions about the bath even before discovering this, and refuses to use it, eventually deciding to destroy it. Her parents catch her in the act and she is sent to an asylum. At the end of the story, the father decides to go on a killing spree whilst in the bath.
Killer Camera – A boy buys a camera as a birthday present, unaware that it has been imbued with dark magic – anything that is photographed is destroyed; he searches for his family, who have taken the camera with them on a trip to London. He manages to find them and is relieved to hear that they have not taken any pictures of each other – until he is told that his brother took a picture of the London skyline.
Light Moves – A computer formerly owned by now-deceased horse-racing journalist, Ethan Sly, has the power to give horse racing tips. A schoolboy is given the computer as a present, and ends up being forced by the local bully to give him the names of the winners. However, one of the names it gives – "Light Moves" – is the name of a company whose van runs over the bully.
The Night Bus – On Halloween night, two brothers returning home from a party, go on an unexpected bus tour of London's cemeteries.
Harriet's Horrible Dream – A rich girl's family no longer has enough money to support her and she has been sold to a restaurant owned by a family friend which serves human meat. Then she wakes up, realising that it was all a nightmare – until she looks at her surroundings.
Scared – A school bully gets his comeuppance while walking through the countryside.
A Career in Computer Games – A boy who has recently left school with no qualifications, due to his obsession with computer games, thinks he has found the job of a lifetime testing an upcoming video game, but finds himself trapped in a brutally realistic world where countless men in black suits shoot at him.
The Man with the Yellow Face – A boy gets his photo taken at a train station, in a sinister photo booth which produces pictures that foretell future events. The picture he gets shows a grown up with a hideously deformed yellow face. The train he boards crashes and injures him severely, leaving him with the same yellow face as the one in the photo.
The Monkey's Ear – A family purchases a monkey's ear able to grant wishes. Although there is one catch – it is partially deaf. So when the father shouts at his son to go to hell, they don't know where he has gone.

More Horowitz Horror
More Horowitz Horror was published as a sequel collection in 2000. The book is marketed as containing eight stories. However, the tales obviously written by Horowitz himself are supplemented by an allegedly unauthorised add-on, written satirically by a serial killer.

As with its forerunner, More Horowitz Horror is not confined to third-person narrative. "The Hitchhiker" and "Twist Cottage" are written in first-person, while "Burnt" (renamed as Burned in the US release) is expressed as a series of diary entries. Meanwhile, "The Shortest Horror Story Ever Written" communicates directly with the reader through second-person narrative.

Synopses
The Hitchhiker – A family is on their way home from a day at the seaside when they unwittingly allow a psychopath, supposedly from the nearby asylum, into their car (A clue to his real identity is the false name – "Mr. Rellik" – he gives them, which spelt backwards is Killer). Only the son works out the truth, but his parents do not believe him. He pushes the hitchhiker out of the car and he is killed. It is then revealed that the hitchhiker was actually a gardener for the lunatic asylum, and that his name is Mr. Renwick (not "Rellik" as the boy misheard.) We then learn that the boy himself is an inmate of the asylum, and was out on day release for the first time after being committed to the asylum for pushing his older brother in front of a train and killing him. He is returned to the asylum following the murder of Mr. Renwick.
The Sound of Murder – A deaf schoolgirl learns the horrifying truth behind her new French teacher through her malfunctioning hearing aid, and then hears his plans to murder her, too.
Burnt (North American title: "Burned") – While on holiday in Barbados, a boy called Timothy has concerns about his uncle, who is desperate to get a suntan. Timothy's aunt, who no longer loves her husband, has replaced the sun tan lotion with cooking oil, burning her husband's skin.
Flight 715 – A girl has a nightmare, in which she foresees that the airliner which is about to fly her family home from a vacation in Vancouver is destined to crash. Since her family do not believe her, the girl takes matters into her own hands. She wanders off on her own – making it impossible for her family to travel – and only returns after the aircraft has taken off. What neither she nor her family find out is that the aircraft is damaged in flight, and that if their extra weight had been on board, it wouldn't have landed safely and the girl's nightmare would have come true.
Howard's End – A delinquent teenage boy is run over by a bus and finds himself in Heaven – or so he thinks. He becomes bored with the idyllic existence, and wants to move to Hell – but it is revealed he was there all along (this story is similar to the Twilight Zone episode "A Nice Place to Visit").
The Lift (North American title: "The Elevator") – A police detective investigates the strange disappearance of a spoiled boy at Covent Garden tube station. The boy got into an elevator, but never came out. The inspector comes to the conclusion that the boy was in a lift with a group of cannibals.
The Phone Goes Dead – A teenage boy discovers that his mobile phone can receive calls from the dead, after its last owner died while using it. He repeatedly receives messages telling him to tell people about how to deal with their death, but he never tells anybody. His parents later receive a phone call from him – after he has been killed in a bus accident on a school trip.
Twist Cottage – A man goes to sinister lengths to rid himself and his son of his dreadful second wife by moving to a cottage haunted by the ghost of a witch who kills any woman who enters.
The Shortest Horror Story Ever Written – An add-on to the book purportedly written by a maniac, not Anthony Horowitz. He describes how his own horror story was refused publication, so he set out on a killing spree. If the first letter of each sentence is put together, then the phrase "I am going to murder you soon" is spelled out.

External links
Anthony Horowitz.com
More Horowitz Horror at fantasticfiction.co.uk

1999 short story collections
2000 short story collections
Cannibalism in fiction
Short story collections by Anthony Horowitz
Horror short story collections
Orchard Books books